Billy Baxter may refer to:
Billy Baxter (motorcyclist) (born  1963), British motorcyclist who set the blind solo world land speed record on a motorbike
Billy Baxter (footballer) (1939–2009),  Scottish footballer
Billy Baxter (poker player) (born 1940), American poker player and sports bettor
Billy 'Silver Dollar' Baxter (1926–2012), American film producer
Billy Baxter (musician) (born c. 1959), Australian radio presenter and musician
"Billy Baxter" (song), a 1980 song by Paul Kelly & the Dots describing the musician

See also
Bill Baxter (disambiguation)
William Baxter (disambiguation)
Baxter (disambiguation)